The Macedonia national futsal team is controlled by the Football Federation of Macedonia, the governing body for futsal in North Macedonia. It represents the country in international futsal competitions, such as the World Cup and the European Championships.

Competition history

FIFA Futsal World Cup

 1989 - Part of Yugoslavia
 1992 - did not compete
 1996 - did not compete
 2000 - did not qualify
 2004 - did not qualify
 2008 - did not qualify
 2012 - did not qualify
 2016 - did not qualify
 2020 - did not qualify

UEFA Futsal Championship

 1996 - did not compete
 1999 - did not compete
 2001 - did not qualify
 2003 - did not qualify
 2005 - did not qualify
 2007 - did not qualify
 2010 - did not qualify
 2012 - did not qualify
 2014 - did not qualify
 2016 - did not qualify
 2018 - did not qualify
 2022 – did not qualify''

Current squad

Goalkeepers

 Ilčo Udovaliev- KMF Železarec
 Miroslav Todorovski- KMF Skopje
 Antonio Petrovski- KMF Skopje
Defense
 Zoran Leveski- KMF Železarec
 Ferid Agushi- FC Prishtina Futsal
 Ivan Krstevski- FC Prishtina Futsal
 Dzo Arsovski- KMF Železarec
Offense
 Aleksandar Gligorov- KMF Železarec
 Igor Leovski- KMF Skopje
 Oliver Jovanovski- KMF Železarec
 Darko Rangotov- KMF Škver
 Martin Todorovski- KMF Železarec
 Adrijan Micevski- KMF Železarec
 Trajče Trajkov- KMF Železarec

References

External links
 Official website

Macedonia
National sports teams of North Macedonia
Futsal in North Macedonia